Siwe may refer to:

Siwé, Benin

People with the surname
 (1897–1966), Swedish pediatrician who described Letterer–Siwe disease
Alphonse Siyam Siwe (born 1953), Cameroonian politician
Lisa Siwe (born 1968), Swedish director
Tom Siwe (born 1987), Swedish footballer
Jacques Siwe (born 2001), French footballer

See also

Siwi (disambiguation)